Andreas Kemmerling (born 21 February 1950 in Bad Homburg vor der Höhe) is a German philosopher. He works in the analytic tradition.

Life 
Kemmerling studied philosophy from 1968 to 1972 in Marburg, Frankfurt am Main and Munich. In 1976 he got a doctor degree. After his so-called "Habilitation" in 1981 in Bielefeld he was visiting professor at the University of Southern California in Los Angeles. From 1983 until 1999 he was professor in Munich. Since 1999 he is professor at the Ruprecht-Karls-Universität in Heidelberg.

Kemmerling is a co-founder of the European Society for Analytical Philosophy and organizes the Heidelberger Kompaktseminar every year. In the Heidelberger Kompaktseminar a distinguished philosopher is invited to present his most recent work on a certain topic. In the past the following philosophers have held a Kompaktseminar Brian Loar, Fred Dretske, Paul Horwich, Stephen Schiffer, Crispin Wright, Timothy Williamson, Christof Rapp, Wolfgang Künne, Thomas Hofweber and Ned Block.

Achievements 
Part of Kemmerling's achievements are his works on philosophy of language, especially on Paul Grice, and in philosophy of mind, in particular on Descartes.

Works 
Was Grice mit "Meinen" meint - Eine Rekonstruktion der Griceschen Analyse rationaler Kommunikation, Forschungsberichte des IPK der Universität München 8, 1977, 121–166.
Mentale Repräsentationen, Kognitionswissenschaft 1 (1991), 47–57.
Descartes über das Bewußtsein, in Studia Philosophica 55 (1996), Jahrbuch der Schweizerischen Philosophischen Gesellschaft, 85 - 114.
Zur sog. Naturalisierung von Intentionalität, in: A. Burri (Hrsg.), Sprache und Denken, Berlin/New York 1997, 237-258 (eine frühere Fassung erschien in: Wittgenstein Studies 1997).
Gricy Actions, in: G. Cosenza (ed.), Paul Grice's Heritage, Brepols 2001, 69–95.
Die erste moderne Konzeption mentaler Repräsentation, in: U. Meixner/A. Newen (Hrsg.), Seele, Denken und Bewußtsein — Zur Philosophie des Geistes von Platon bis Husserl, Berlin/New York 2003, 153 - 196.
Ideen des Ichs - Studien zu Descartes' Philosophie, Frankfurt a.M. ²2005.
Glauben. Essay über einen Begriff, Frankfurt a.M. 2017.

External links 

Homepage an der Ruprecht-Karls-Universität in Heidelberg

1950 births
German philosophers
Living people